Natalie Arras Tepper (1888-1950) was an American painter of New York State scenes.

Biography
Natalie Tepper worked with Guy Wiggins, Eric Pape, James McManus, and John R. Koopman.

Leon Friend, art tutor at Brooklyn's Abraham Lincoln High School, wrote:

Natalie Arras Tepper sees the broad, airy vistas of upper New York State as we should like to see them. In this, Tepper's third annual exhibition, distinct, significant areas of tones are played against each other to produce effects of modeling as solid and as vital as the substance the artist interprets. While refreshingly free in treatment, these nature-inspired melodies are nevertheless designed, not casual. The spontaneous brush-strokes are the result of the kind of forethought and understanding that accompany the master sculptor on his excursions into the stone. Thus far Tepper's every step, in the realm of painting, has been a step forward.

Natalie's works are signed in bold block letters simply N.A.Tepper.

Natalie Arras Tepper's paintings have been on exhibit at the Abraham Lincoln Gallery, Brooklyn N.Y.,; Brooklyn Museum, Brooklyn, N.Y.;, Albany Institute of History and Art, Albany N.Y.;  American Fine Arts Galleries, 215W 57th Street, N.Y.

She died on Aug 5, 1950 At the time of death, Natalie Arras Tepper, relict of the late Robert Tepper, resided in Woodstock, N.Y. (and in earlier years, Brooklyn, N.Y).

Notable works

Winter in Manhattan, 1940
Trimming the Hedges
Houses and Figures in a Rocky Landscape
The Home Front
Woodstock Saw Mill
Studio Corner
Village Square
Still Life
Red Barns
Shrine
Shady Valley
Blue Hills
Doris
Twaafskill Folks

Impression
Resignation
Sheltering Green
Quiet of a Rainy Day
Fork of the River
Shadow of Blue Hills
Between Rounds
Corn Crib and Barns
Meadow Dawn Farm
Road to Tiffany Farm
Old Lyme Town Hall
Dutch Colonial House
The Cove
Meadow Pond

Betty
Carmelita
River Docks
Edgewater
Girl Resting
Sunflowers
The Studio
Sunlight and Shadow
Barns
Landscape in Abstract
Farm House
Studio Interior
Elsie
Still Life

References 

1888 births
1950 deaths
Painters from New York City
People from Brooklyn
20th-century American painters
National Association of Women Artists members
20th-century American women artists